Nelo is a genus of moths in the family Geometridae. Nelo discalis is the type species.

Although originally placed in the family Lithosiidae (Arctiidae), this genus was transferred to the Geometridae. Some authors included Nelo Walker, 1854, as well as some other genera (Sangala Walker, 1854; Melanoptilon Herrich-Schäffer, 1855; and Nelopsis Warren, 1895) as junior synonyms of Drymoea Walker, 1854.

Species
 Nelo altera
 Nelo coccineata
 Nelo crescens Warren 1904
 Nelo cydrara Druce 1907
 Nelo darthula Thierry-Mieg 1893
 Nelo discalis Walker 1854
 Nelo dolopia Druce 1907
 Nelo flora Warren 1897
 Nelo lena Thierry-Mieg 1910
 Nelo lippa Schaus 1892
 Nelo mediata Warren 1906
 Nelo subobscura Thierry-Mieg 1910
 Nelo unciata Warren 1895

Species transferred
 Nelo basalis
 Nelo philodamea

Description
Members of this genus are generally black with pectinate (comb-like) antennae.

Distribution
The range of Nelo includes Bolivia, Colombia, Costa Rica, Ecuador, and Peru.

References

Geometridae
Geometridae of South America
Moths of South America